Air Burkina SA is the national airline of Burkina Faso, operating scheduled services from its main base at Ouagadougou Airport to one domestic destination, Bobo-Dioulasso, as well as regional services to Togo, Benin, Mali, Niger, Côte d'Ivoire, Senegal and Ghana. From 2001 to 2017, the airline was majority owned by an AKFED/IPS consortium, but is now back in government ownership, with reports that a new investor is being sought.

History 
The airline was established on 17 March 1967 under the name Air Volta. It was originally part owned by the Burkinabé government, part by Air France and part privately held. It purchased its first aircraft, an Embraer EMB-110 Bandeirante, in 1978, and added a second, a Fokker F28, in 1983.

Over the years, the airline has had serious debt problems, reaching a deficit of one billion CFA francs in 1992 (approx. €1,500,000). In part to address its debt problem, the Burkina Faso government privatised Air Burkina on 21 February 2001, transferring 56% of the shares to the AKFED/IPS consortium, part of the Aga Khan Development Network. At that time, the government retained 14% of shares. In 2001, following Air Burkina's privatisation and the liquidation of Air Afrique, the airline's debt had largely been alleviated and it was predicting an annual revenue of around 3.5 billion CFA francs (more than €5,000,000).

The company saw a general strike in 2002, when workers demanded a 25% wage increase. In the resulting conflict, the director-general of Air Burkina was forced to resign. 

In August 2013 press reports said that the majority shareholder, AKFED & IPS, will be called in for talks by the Government after its most recent Council of Ministers meeting resolved to discuss the airline's financial state. According to the Burkinabé Ministry of Infrastructure & Transport, a report presented to government claimed the Burkinabé national carrier "faces a difficult financial and economic situation." In May 2017 it was announced that the government had taken over the management of Air Burkina, following the signing of a contract of management cessation with AKFED, with the sale of shares to be made at a symbolic franc. There were also reports that a new investor was being sought.

Corporate affairs

Shareholders
The airline is currently (May 2017) owned by the Government of Burkina Faso.

From 2001 to 2017, the company has been majority owned by an AKFED/IPS consortium, and was therefore a member of the Celestair alliance of African airlines.

Business trends
Financial and other business figures for Air Burkina are not fully available, as the company was privately owned until 2017. In the absence of the accounts, some information has been made available, usually in the press, as shown below:

Head office
Air Burkina is headquartered in the Air Burkina Building (French: Immeuble Air Burkina) in Avenue de la Nation, Ouagadougou.

Destinations 
Air Burkina serves the following destinations (as of May 2017):

Codeshare agreements
Air Burkina has codeshare agreements with the following airlines:

 Air France
 ASKY Airlines
 Kenya Airways

Fleet

Current fleet
, the Air Burkina fleet consists of the following aircraft:

Historical fleet
The airline has operated various aircraft in the past, including two Bombardier CRJ200s, two McDonnell Douglas MD-87s and 3 Fokker F28s.

Notable pilots 

 Zenab Issa Oki Soumaïne was Chad's first female pilot and flew for Air Burkina.

References

AeroTransport Data Bank

External links

Air Burkina 
Air Burkina Fleet

Airlines of Burkina Faso
Aga Khan Development Network
Airlines established in 1967
1967 establishments in Upper Volta